The World Group was the highest level of Davis Cup competition in 2017. The first-round losers went into the Davis Cup World Group Play-offs, and the winners progressed to the quarterfinals and the World Group stage of the competition in 2018.

Participating teams

Seeds

Draw

First round

Argentina vs. Italy

Germany vs. Belgium

Australia vs. Czech Republic

United States vs. Switzerland

Japan vs. France

Canada vs. Great Britain

Shapovalov defaulted the rubber and the tie after accidentally hitting a ball into the face of the chair umpire.

Serbia vs. Russia

Croatia vs. Spain

Quarterfinals

Belgium vs. Italy

Australia vs. United States

France vs. Great Britain

Serbia vs. Spain

Semifinals

Belgium vs. Australia

France vs. Serbia

Final

France vs. Belgium

References

World Group